A video ad platform (VAP) helps publishers manage the advertising that appears in their online video, marketed as software as a service. Ad serving technologies are commonly used for managing web banner ads, but are especially designed to manage ads displayed in online video players, such as the widely used pre-roll and overlay format ads. VAP services can include but are not limited to:

 Ad serving
 Ad measurement
 Ad network management
 Yield optimization
 Inventory forecasting
 Ad format and frequency controls

Online video advertising platforms increased in popularity and revenue by 2011.

See also 
 Online advertising
 Pay per play
 Viral marketing

References

Online advertising